Darlington Mowden Park is a professional rugby union club, based in Darlington, County Durham, England. They currently compete in National League 1, the third division of the Rugby Football Union domestic league competition pyramid, having achieved promotion on 3 May 2014, after defeating Ampthill in the 2013–14 play-off. The club's former name, Darlington Grammar School Old Boys, was changed when they moved to Yiewsley Drive, which was located in Mowden. They relocated to The Darlington Arena, a 25,000 all-seater stadium in Darlington, purchasing the previously-vacated ground for £2 million; Yiewsley Drive had previously been sold to a housing estate company, and the Arena was previously owned by Darlington Football Club. They played their first game at the arena on 2 February 2013, in front of a crowd of over 1,000, comprehensively defeating Bromsgrove 62–7 in a National League 2 North league game.

History
The club emerged in the post World War 2 period and was constituted in 1950 as Darlington Grammar School Old Boys.

In 1970–71 the Old Boys, with growing numbers of players and supporters, decided to buy land and build their own clubhouse and pitches. Mowden was chosen to be the new official home of the rapidly growing Old Boys club. It was deemed appropriate, not least because the club was no longer an "Old Boys Club", to change its name to Mowden Park RFC.

In the 1990s and 2000s Mowden Park (DMPRFC) experienced great success. Mowden rapidly went through the league system until they reached National Three North (now National league Two North), in which they spent many years. Mowden also had several years of excellent Tetley Bitter Cup runs. The Tetley Bitter Cup, the old LV Cup, included every English Rugby Union club. In 2000, while in the old North East 1, Mowden reached the 5th round (quarter-finals) of the Tetley Bitter cup after beating the prestigious London club Rosslyn Park in the 4th round in front of a home crowd of around 2,000+. In the fifth round they faced premiership opponents in the form of Harlequins at the Twickenham Stoop. The following years also saw further adventures in the National Cup. In 2001 Mowden once again defied league position and reached the 4th round of cup, only to narrowly lose to Birmingham & Solihull who, at the time, were in Allied-Dunbar Premiership 2. In 2002 they, once again, managed to get to the 4th round, only to narrowly lose at home to Manchester, who were in the old Allied Dunbar Premiership 2. Mowden 'legends' of this era included the likes of Tuihana, Keeligan, Brown, Lowe, Irwin, Mckinnon, Sinclair, Oliphant, Mitchell, Sanderson, Kent and Mattison.  A newer cohort of legends include the Connon brothers, Zylon McGaffin, Alan 'Swags' Jones, Chris 'China' Peace, and Josh Waldin - who was later bestowed the honour of best looking man to ever play for the North East club.

Players in the upper echelons of the game to have graced Yiewlsey Drive and worn the Mowden Shirt, if but for a few games, include Toby Flood (England) and Craig Newby (New Zealand All Blacks) (both Leicester Tigers RFC), Alex Tait (Newcastle Falcons RFC), Peter Browne (Harlequins RFC), Phil Dowson (Northampton Saints RFC), Tim Visser (Edinburgh RFC + Scotland) and Richard Arnold (Newcastle Falcons RFC). Epi Taione (Newcastle, Sale Sharks and Racing Metro) put in some social appearances for the club. The club has also had mini and juniors go on to play in the Guinness Premiership – Ross Batty (Bath Rugby), Tom Catterick (Newcastle Falcons) and Alex Gray (London Irish). These lads also have represented England and will hopefully go on to gain full caps.

They played in National League 2 North in the 2013–14 season.  Having finished as runners-up, they qualified for the promotion playoff against 2013–14 National League 2 South runners-up, Ampthill.  The game was played on 3 May 2014 at the Northern Echo Arena.  The game finished 25–25 after normal time, so went to two 10-minute periods of extra time.  The game was won with a try scored in the 3rd minute of added on time.  As a result, they will play in National League 1 in the 2014–15 season, the highest league Darlington Mowden Park R.F.C. have reached in their history.]

Current standings

Club information

Rivalries
Mowden are part of the rich fabric of rugby union in the North East. Rugby union is the North East's second sport, behind the round-ball code, with cricket also popular. Mowden have enjoyed many good local rivalries over the years. The club's traditional rivals are Darlington RFC. Another traditional rivalry was with Darlington Railway Athletic RUFC, however Darlington RA RUFC finished operations in the 1990s.

Women's team
Darlington Mowden Park Sharks are a successful women's team. They currently, 2020–21 season, play in the RFU Women's top-level Allianz Premier 15s against clubs such as Bristol, Wasps, Saracens and Harlequins.  Several of the players and former players are internationally capped such as Tamara Taylor and Katy McLean for England, and Lindsay Wheeler for Scotland, however there are a strong crop of young players who will no doubt follow in their footsteps. McLean was named captain of the England Elite squad on 18 January 2011, succeeding Catherine Spencer after she stepped down. DMP Sharks play on a Sunday and attract a good crowd due to the women playing at the highest of club levels. They recently finished 10th in the 2020/21 RFUW Premiership after a tough year, but are at the start of a three year project and will go from strength to strength in the seasons ahead.

Development squads
DMPRFC currently have three senior teams and a sevens team:
the first team operates on a professional basis in National League 1
the second team play in the North Eastern CANDY League Division 1
the third team also play in a local North Eastern league
NCMP7 (Newitts Centurians Mowden Park 7s).  During the off season, Mowden enter several 7s competitions, having teamed up with Newitts Centurions, with 1st XV players and guests normally making up the teams.

DMPRFC provide rugby union at every level. DMPRFC have teams at every level from under-7s to under-12s. Boys and girls play together in these teams.

DMPRFC have a boys team at every level from under-13s to under-18s. Many of the boys go on to represent county and above at their respective age groups. Once junior level has finished most will move on to the colts or one of the senior teams.

DMPRFC also provides separate junior girls teams once mini rugby has finished. The under-18s and under-15s are very successful teams within the North. There is also the prospect of playing in the Women's Premiership with the Darlington Mowden Park Sharks.

Club colours
Home: The traditional colours are a royal blue and white hoops shirt, royal blue shorts and royal blue socks with white.

Away: Grey shirt with grey shorts and socks.

Stadia
DMP play at The Darlington Arena, a 25,000-seat stadium in the town. The stadium is now called the Northern Echo Arena as it sponsored by the Northern Echo news and media company. 

The New Zealand All Blacks used the stadium as a base during the 2015 Rugby World Cup.

Honours
 Durham Senior Cup winners (7): 1998, 1999, 2000, 2003, 2007, 2016, 2017
 Durham/Northumberland 2 champions: 1987–88
 Durham/Northumberland 1 champions: 1993–94
 North East 2 champions: 1997–98
 North 2 champions: 1998–99
 North Division 2 champions: 1999–00
 National League 3 North champions (2): 2000–01, 2011–12
 National League 2 (north v south) promotion play-off winner: 2013–14

References

External links
 Official website

1945 establishments in England
English rugby union teams
Rugby clubs established in 1945
Rugby union in County Durham
Sport in the Borough of Darlington